Cyathea dichromatolepis is a species of fern in the family Cyatheaceae, native to Southeast Brazil. It was first described by Fée in 1869 as Alsophila dichromatolepis.

References

dichromatolepis
Flora of Southeast Brazil
Plants described in 1869